XHAS-FM is a radio station on 101.5 FM in Nuevo Laredo, Tamaulipas, Mexico. It is owned by Grupo Radiorama and known as Fiesta Mexicana.

History
XEAS-AM 1410 received its concession in March 1948. By the 1960s, it was owned by José María Villarreal Montemayor, and by the 1980s, ownership had transferred to Deyla Ruiz Guajardo de Villarreal. The station became an AM-FM combo in 1994 and was sold to its current concessionaire in 2000.

On December 15, 2021, as part of the concession renewal process, the station surrendered its AM frequency.

References

External links

Grupo Radiorama
Radio stations in Nuevo Laredo
Regional Mexican radio stations
Spanish-language radio stations
Radio stations established in 1948
1948 establishments in Mexico